Greenhill Park may refer to:

 Greenhill Park at Greenhill, Edinburgh, Scotland
  a ship that exploded in Vancouver, B.C. in 1945.
 Green Hill Park, Worcester, Massachusetts, United States